Petr Pravec (born September 17, 1967) is a Czech astronomer and a discoverer of minor planets, born in Třinec, Czech Republic.

Pravec is a prolific discoverer of binary asteroids, expert in photometric observations and rotational lightcurves at Ondřejov Observatory. He is credited by the Minor Planet Center with the discovery and co-discovery of 350 numbered minor planets, and is leading the effort of a large consortium of stations called "BinAst" to look for multiplicity in the near-Earth objects and inner main-belt populations.

He is a member of the Academy of Sciences of the Czech Republic.

The main-belt asteroid 4790 Petrpravec, discovered by Eleanor Helin in 1988, is named after him. The official naming citation was published by the Minor Planet Center on 20 June 1997.

List of discovered minor planets

References

External links 
 Ondrejov Asteroid Photometry Project, Pravec, P.; Wolf, M.; Sarounova, L.

1967 births
Czech astronomers
Discoverers of asteroids

Living people
People from Třinec
20th-century astronomers
21st-century astronomers